The Lower Estuarine Series, also called in more modern publications, the Grantham Formation, is a relatively complex but generally thin set of geological strata which are usually considered as a group. It forms a lower part of the (Bajocian) Inferior Oolite Group, which lies in the Middle Jurassic. Where found, it is normally above the Northampton sand and below the Lower Lincolnshire Limestone Member.

The group is found in the East Midlands of England and was formed when the London-Brabant Island was drifting through the low northern latitudes, in conditions represented today by the Sahara Desert. The land was eroded by wind action and by occasional downpours which carried the debris to the margin of a shallow sea.

It is not a major feature and does not generally extend to much more than 0.5 metre thick. It does, however, occasionally achieve 7.5 metres of thickness.

Geology of England
Geologic formations of the United Kingdom